Kennedy Nkeyasen (born April 7, 1976, in Ghana) is a former free safety (converted from running back) who played for the Saskatchewan Roughriders of the Canadian Football League.

Nkeyasen was drafted out of college by Saskatchewan (18th overall) in 1999.  The CFL awarded him non-import status because he played his high school football at Thom Collegiate in Regina, Saskatchewan, Canada. He attended college at Idaho State University.

Nkeyasen missed most of the 2007 CFL season due to an achilles tendon injury suffered in a pre-season game.

In June 2008, Kennedy accepted a Public Relations position with the Saskatchewan Roughriders.

Notes

External links 
Roughriders' Nkeyasen player bio

1978 births
Living people
Canadian football defensive backs
Idaho State Bengals football players
Ghanaian footballers
Saskatchewan Roughriders players
Association footballers not categorized by position
People from Tamale, Ghana